Axis forces were involved in counter-insurgency operations against the various resistance movements during World War II.

During the Second World War, resistance movements that bore any resemblance to irregular warfare were frequently dealt with by the occupying forces under the auspices of anti-partisan warfare, particularly in territories occupied by Nazi forces. In many cases, the Nazis euphemistically used the term "anti-partisan operations" to obfuscate their ethnic cleansing and ideological warfare operations against perceived enemies; this included Jews, Communist officials (so-called Jewish Bolsheviks), Red Army stragglers, and others. This was especially the case on the Eastern Front, where anti-partisan operations often resulted in the massacres of innocent civilians. While the worst atrocities in terms of scale occurred in the Eastern theater of the war, the Nazis employed "anti-partisan" tactics in Western Europe as well.

Origins and military doctrine

The forms of resistance varied depending on place and time, and so did the Germans' countermeasures. Both the scale of resistance and the severity of German reprisals were much more limited in the West than in the East. While Germans were much more likely to treat the entire local populace as enemies in the East, they were much less ideologically driven in the West, where, for example, women and children were only rarely killed by SS troops, but a much more common target in the East. Some scholars have noted that in the East, the anti-partisan operations gave Germans a pretext for ideologically motivated ethnic cleansing.

The Germans concentrated on short-term victories against the partisans and were able, in some cases, to defeat the partisans militarily, but overall their atrocities against civilians in the East resulted in a continuous flow of volunteers joining the partisan ranks. The first resistance movements were created as early as late 1939 in occupied Poland (see the Separated Unit of the Polish Army). As the war progressed and the number of Nazi-occupied territories grew, so did the number and strength of resistance movements.

Throughout the war, regular formations of German army, auxiliary police formations (Ordnungspolizei) and their helpers (Schutzmannschaft or Hilfspolizei) participated in anti-partisan operations. The struggle of Germans versus the partisans can be described as a stalemate, eventually ended by the German military defeat in the regular war. After the war, brutal German tactics used against the partisans were one of the charges presented at the Nuremberg Trials (see legality of the Commando Order and Hostages Trial).

Operations by country and territory

German-occupied Poland

The Polish resistance movement was formed soon after the German invasion of Poland in September 1939 and quickly grew in response to the brutal methods of the German occupation. Polish resistance had operatives in the urban areas, as well as in the forests (leśni). Throughout the war, the Polish resistance grew in numbers, and increased the scale of its operations, requiring the Germans to devote an increasing amount of resources (personnel, equipment and time) to deal with the partisan threat.

Polish partisans were particularly active in the Zamość region (see the Zamość Uprising). Sturmwind I and Sturmwind II ("Hurricane") in June 1944 were the largest German operations against the Polish leśni partisans, based on the "cauldron operations" Germans developed to deal with the Soviet partisans (see also battle of Osuchy). German losses in those operations amounted to about 1,300 fatalities and similar number of wounded; partisan losses were similar. Soon afterward, the Polish resistance launched a series of major operations against the Germans (Operation Tempest), of which the Warsaw Uprising was the best known. In Operation Tempest, Polish partisans challenged the Germans in a series of open battles for the control of vital strategic areas. The Germans were not prepared for the vast scale of the Polish operation, but had the advantage of numbers and better equipment; further, when the Polish partisans had to operate without the support of the advancing Red Army, they were significantly less effective. In areas where the Soviets cooperated with the Poles, the Germans were much less able to suppress the partisans, but where the Soviets did not advance to aid the Poles, as was the case with the Warsaw Uprising, the Germans were able to concentrate enough regular army and anti-partisan units to defeat the Polish insurgents.

The tactics and policies the Germans developed in Poland served as a template for similar operations against the Soviet partisans.

German-occupied areas of the Soviet Union

In early 1941 Germans set up special units – Wehrmacht Security Divisions – to deal with securing the rear and carrying out anti-partisan duties. These formations were also involved in the repression of civilians, including participation in The Holocaust by rounding up Jews.

The policies the Germans employed in the occupied Soviet territories were the extension of the brutal policies they had developed over the previous two years in occupied Poland. At first, the Germans tried to cow the local populace with violence. The policies of 1941 were aimed more at a potential threat than a real one, as the Soviet partisans were only just organizing in the aftermath of the German invasion. It was on the Eastern Front (including the Balkans) that there was the greatest German terror against the local populace. To a certain degree, it is hard to distinguish pure military anti-partisan operations from ethnic cleansing actions.

With the German failure to topple the Soviet Union in the first year of the war, the anti-partisan policy changed, switching from short-term to a more long-term view. Nazi propaganda and similar tactics were employed in order to influence the local populace and make them more friendly towards the Germans (and less towards the partisans). It was at this time that Germans started to support the creation of local auxiliary units to be used against the partisans. The anti-partisan operations also became more professional and better organized.

By late 1942, the "hearts and minds" policy had already weakened. Around 1942–1943, large-scale "encirclement operations" were employed, which involved the use of regular army units, detached from the frontline, against the partisans. Such operations often involved the destruction of villages that were seen as potentially supporting the partisans; that meant both the physical destruction of the buildings and the massacres of local inhabitants. These "encirclement operations" antagonized the local populace, contributing to the growth, not shrinking, of the Soviet partisans' ranks. Major "encirclement operations" included Operation München and Operation Bamberg (March–April 1942), Operation Hannover (May–June 1942), Operation Vogelsang (June–July 1942) and Operation Zigeunerbaron ("Gypsy Baron", May–June 1943).

This project, seen by Germans as one of the most successful German anti-partisan policies (and later imitated by other armies, for example, the French in Algeria or the United States in Vietnam), involved the creation of autonomous and well-armed villages, in collaboration with local Nazi sympathizers. The advance of the Red Army and liberation of the remaining Soviet territories from under the German occupation prevented the full implementation of this policy.

German-occupied Italy

Casualties in Italy among the Italian Resistance Movement include 35,828 partisans killed in action or executed, and 21,168 partisans mutilated or left disabled by their wounds. Another 32,000 Italian partisans were killed abroad (in the Balkans and, to a lesser extent, in France). According to other estimates, the Italian resistance lost some 50,000 fighters throughout the conflict. Thousands to tens of thousands of Italian civilians were killed in reprisals by the German and Italian Fascist forces.

Armed resistance to the German occupation following the armistice between Italy and Allied armed forces at first included mainly the Italian regular forces, such as the Italian Armed Forces and the Carabinieri military police. Later, the Comitato di Liberazione Nazionale (Committee of National Liberation, or CLN), created by the Italian Communist Party, the Italian Socialist Party, the Partito d'Azione (a republican liberal socialist party), Democrazia Cristiana and other minor parties, took control of the movement.

In their attempts to suppress the Resistance, German and Italian Fascist forces (especially the SS, Gestapo, and paramilitary militias such as Xª MAS and Black Brigades) committed war crimes, including summary executions and systematic reprisals against the civilian population. Resistance captives and suspects, as well as random local Italian civilians, were often tortured and raped. Italian partisans, especially those in the mountainous and rural regions, relied heavily on the local populace for support and supplies. The Nazis tried to punish the populace and discourage civilian support for the Resistance by adopting a reprisal policy of killing 10 Italians for every German killed by the partisans. Those executed would usually come from the village near where a partisan attack against Nazis took place and sometimes included captive partisan fighters themselves. 

Some of the most notorious mass atrocities included the Ardeatine massacre (335 Italian Jewish civilians and Italian political prisoners executed in a reprisal operation the day after the Via Rasella attack in Rome), the Sant'Anna di Stazzema massacre (about 560 random Italian villagers brutally killed in an anti-partisan operation in the central mountains), the Marzabotto massacre (about 770 Italian civilians killed in similar circumstances) and the Salussola massacre (20 Italian partisan murdered after being tortured). In all, an estimated 15,000 Italian civilians were deliberately killed, including many women and children.

In addition, following the Italian armistice, the Germans collectively rounded up and interned Italian soldiers, even those not actively involved in the Resistance. Italian soldiers captured by the Germans numbered around 650,000-700,000 (some 45,000 others were killed in combat, executed, or died during transport), of whom between 40,000 and 50,000 later died in the camps. After disarmament by the Germans, the Italian soldiers and officers were confronted with the choice to continue fighting as allies of the Nazi German army (either in the armed forces of the Italian Social Republic, the German puppet regime in northern Italy, or in Italian "volunteer" units in the German armed forces) or, otherwise, be sent to detention camps in Germany. Only 10 percent agreed to cooperate with the Third Reich, with the remainder refusing to enroll or continue fighting for Germany and were instead interned under terrible conditions. The Nazis designated the interned Italian soldiers as Italienische Militär-Internierte ("Italian military internees") to deny them prisoner of war status and the rights granted by the Geneva Convention. The actions of the Italian soldiers who refused to further cooperate with the Nazis were eventually recognized as an act of unarmed resistance.

Axis-occupied Yugoslavia

After the Axis invasion of Yugoslavia, the Yugoslav resistance forces consisted of the Partisans.  The Partisans were a communist-led movement propagating pan-Yugoslav tolerance ("brotherhood and unity") and incorporating republican, left-wing, and liberal elements of Yugoslav politics. The Partisans organized after the Axis invasion of the Soviet Union and were initially supported by the Soviets. The Partisans received universal Allied recognition in place of the Chetniks after the Tehran Conference in 1943. By the time of this conference, the degree of Chetnik-Axis collaboration was indicated to have increased greatly.

During the war, the Axis forces mounted a number of operations against the partisans.  Former Yugoslav historiography recognized seven major offensives, of which the fourth and the fifth came close to defeating the partisan forces, and the seventh almost captured their headquarters.

German-occupied France

In France, as in the rest of occupied Western Europe, Germans used different, milder policies than in the East. Part of that reason was that the scale of resistance facing German authorities was much smaller. A large part of France remained under autonomous Vichy regime. Hence from the very beginning of the occupation, much of the police duties were carried out by local (French) forces.

Around 1943, as the French Resistance grew in size (due to the Vichy regime accepting the deportation of Frenchmen for forced labor in Germany), German anti-partisan operations in France became more serious. Germans deployed military units against the resistance groups, and managed to create a large and successful counter-network of covert collaborators, which succeeded in infiltrating many cells of the French Resistance. The first major German military operation against the French Resistance took place in early 1944 in the mountainous region of the French Alps and French Jura. The French resistance forces went to ground and reorganized soon after the German operation ended. Soon afterward, another operation where the French Resistance challenged the Germans to a battle at Plateau de Glieres in Savoy ended in a German victory. Despite this defeat and London's advice to avoid head-on confrontation, in the aftermath of the Allied invasion of France (D-Day) the French Resistance openly challenged German forces in several areas. After several early Resistance successes, German countermeasures became particularly harsh. Once seriously threatened, German forces resorted to brutality and terror that had been mostly unheard of previously on the Western front (but commonplace on the Eastern). The largest atrocity occurred in Oradour-sur-Glane, where the Germans massacred 642 local inhabitants and burned the village. German terror tactics proved successful in the short term, as the shocked Resistance pulled back.

Around July and August, Germans launched their largest operations against the Maquis du Vercors. Similar to the "cauldron operations" employed in the Soviet Union, 10,000 German troops encircled and destroyed a 4,000-strong local partisan force, also committing atrocities against the local civilian population, in order to terrorize the locals and to prevent the surviving partisans from regrouping in the villages.

List of anti-partisan operations

1941
 Uzice (27 September – 15 October 1941)       — attempts to suppress partisans in western Serbia
 Ozren (1941 & 1942)   — two attempts to suppress partisans near Ozren, Bosnia
1942
 Second anti-Partisan Offensive (January 17–23, 1942)    — attempts to suppress partisans in eastern Bosnia
 Hornung (March–April 1942)  — anti-partisan operation in Soviet Union
 Bamberg (March 26 – April 6, 1942)  — anti-partisan operation in Belarus: Hłusk, Bobrujsk
 Trio (March 31 – June 1942)     — also known as the Third anti-Partisan Offensive, action against partisans in region of southern Bosnia
 Operation ? (May 9 – 12, 1942)  — anti-partisan operation in Belarus: Kliczów, Bobrujsk
 Hannover (May–June 1942)  — anti-partisan operation in Soviet Union
 Operation ? (beginning of June 1942)  — anti-partisan operation in Belarus: Słowodka, Bobrujsk
 Operation ? (June 15, 1942)  — anti-partisan operation in Belarus: Borki, Białystok County
 Operation ? (June 21, 1942)  — anti-partisan operation in Belarus: Zbyszin
 Operation ? (June 25, 1942)  — anti-partisan operation in Belarus: Timkowczi
 Operation ? (June 26, 1942)  — anti-partisan operation in Belarus: Studenka
 Vogelsang (June–July 1942)  — anti-partisan operation in Soviet Union
 Adler (July 15 – August 7, 1942)  Anti-partisan operation centered on the Chechivichi region of Belarus: Bobrujsk, Mohylew, Berezyna
 Operation ? (July 18, 1942)  — anti-partisan operation in Belarus: Jelsk
 Greif (August 14–20, 1942)  — anti-partisan operation in Belarus: Orsza, Witebsk
 Sumpffieber (August 22 – September 21, 1942)  — anti-partisan operation in Belarus: White Ruthenia
 Operation ? (September 22–26, 1942)  — anti-partisan operation in Belarus: Małoryta
 Blitz (September 23 – October 3, 1942)  — anti-partisan operation in Belarus: Polotsk, Witebsk
 Operation Alfa (October 5–10, 1942)      — an Italian-Chetnik military operation carried out in the Prozor region
 Karlsbad (October 11–23, 1942)  — anti-partisan operation in Belarus: Orsza, Witebsk
 Nürnberg (November 23–29, 1942)  — anti-partisan operation in Belarus: Dubrowka
 Hamburg (December 10–21, 1942)  — anti-partisan operation in Belarus: Niemen-Szczara
 Altona (December 22–29, 1942)  — anti-partisan operation in Belarus: Słonim
 Risnjak (1942)  — Italian action against partisans in coastal Croatia and Montenegro
1943
 Franz (January 6–14, 1943)  — anti-partisan operation in Belarus: Grodsjanka
 Peter (January 10–11, 1943)  — anti-partisan operation in Belarus: Kliczów, Kolbcza

 Operation ? (January 18–23, 1943)  — anti-partisan operation in Belarus: Słuck, Mińsk, Czerwień
 Erntefest I (until January 28, 1943)  — anti-partisan operation in Belarus: Czerwień, Osipowicze
 Schneehase (January 28 – February 15, 1943)  — anti-partisan operation in Belarus: Polotsk, Rossony, Krasnopole
 Fall Weiss ("Case white") (January – April 1943)     — also known as the Fourth anti-Partisan Offensive; operations in Yugoslavia
 Waldwinter (until February 1, 1943)  — anti-partisan operation in Belarus: Sirotino-Trudy
 Hornung (February 8 – 26, 1943)  — anti-partisan operation in Belarus: Lenin, Hancewicze
 Erntefest II (until February 9, 1943)  — anti-partisan operation in Belarus: Słuck, Kopyl
 Winterzauber (February 15 – end of March 1943)  — anti-partisan operation in Belarus: Oświeja, Latvian border
 Kugelblitz (February 22 - March 8, 1943)  — anti-partisan operation in Belarus: Polotsk, Oświeja, Dryssa, Rossony
 Nixe (until March 19, 1943)  — anti-partisan operation in Belarus: Ptycz-Mikaszewicze, Pińsk
 Föhn (until March 21, 1943)  — anti-partisan operation in Belarus: Pińsk
 Donnerkeil (March 21 – April 2, 1943)  — anti-partisan operation in Belarus: Polotsk, Witebsk
 Frühjahrsbestellung (April 18–22, 1943)  — anti-partisan operation in north-west Russia: Kudever', Novorzhev
 Draufgnger II (May 1–9, 1943)  — anti-partisan operation in Belarus: Rudnja and Manyly forest
 Schwarz ("Black") (May 15 – June 16, 1943)     — Fifth anti-Partisan Offensive, Action against partisans in Yugoslavia
 Maigewitter (May 17–21, 1943)  — anti-partisan operation in Belarus: Witebsk, Suraż, Haradok
 Cottbus (May 20 – June 23, 1943)  — anti-partisan operation in Belarus: Lepel, Begomel, Uszacz
 Weichsel (May 27 – June 10, 1943)  — anti-partisan operation in Belarus: Dniepr-Prypeć Triangle southwest of Homel
 Zigeunerbaron ("Gypsy Baron") (May – June 1943)  — anti-partisan operation in Soviet Union in preparations for the Zitadelle ("Citadel")
 Ziethen (June 13–16, 1943)  — anti-partisan operation in Belarus: Rzeczyca
 Seydlitz (June 25 – July 27, 1943)  — anti-partisan operation in Belarus: Owrucz-Mozyrz
 Günther (until July 14, 1943)  — anti-partisan operation in Belarus: Wołoszyn, Łohojsk
 Hermann (July 13 – August 11, 1943)  — anti-partisan operation in Belarus: Iwie, Nowogródek, Wołoszyn, Stołpce
 Operation ? (July 30, 1943)  — anti-partisan operation in Belarus: Mozyrz
 Fritz (September 24 – October 10, 1943)  — anti-partisan operation in Belarus: Głębokie
 Operation ? (October 9–22, 1943)  — anti-partisan operation in Belarus: Stary Bychów
 Heinrich (November 1–18, 1943)  — anti-partisan operation in Belarus: Rossony, Polotsk, Idrica
 Delphin ("Dolphin") (15 November – 1 December 1943)  — Action on central Dalmatian islands
 Adler (November 1943)   anti-partisan operation on the north Dalmatian coast, between Karlobag and Zadar (Yugoslavia)
 Otto (December 12, 1943 – January 1, 1944)  — anti-partisan operation in Belarus: Oświeja
 Operation ? (December 1943)  — anti-partisan operation in Belarus: Spasskoje
 Operation ? (December 1943)  — anti-partisan operation in Belarus: Biały
 Kugelblitz ("Lightning Ball") (late 1943 and early 1944)  — part of the Sixth anti-Partisan Offensive, anti-partisan action near Vitebsk
 Schneestorm ("Snowstorm") (December 1943)  — part the Sixth anti-Partisan Offensive, anti-partisan action near Jajce

1944

 Operation ? (January 14, 1944)  — anti-partisan operation in Belarus: Oła
 Operation ? (January 22, 1944)  — anti-partisan operation in Belarus: Baiki
 Fruhling and Vercors (January 1944 – July 1944)  — action to suppress FFI activity in Vercors Massif, France followed by main German action to retake Vercors Massif, France
 Wolfsjagd (February 3–15, 1944)  — anti-partisan operation in Belarus: Hłusk, Bobrujsk
 Sumpfhahn (until February 19, 1944)  — anti-partisan operation in Belarus: Hłusk, Bobrujsk
 Operation ? (beginning of March 1944)  — anti-partisan operation in Belarus: Berezyna, Bielnicz
 Auerhahn (April 7–17, 1944)  — anti-partisan operation in Belarus: Bobrujsk

 Frühlingsfest (April 17 - May 12, 1944)  — anti-partisan operation in Belarus: Polotsk, Uszacz
 Kormoran (May 25 – June 17, 1944)  — anti-partisan operation in Belarus: Wilejka, Borysów, Mińsk
 Rösselsprung ("Knight's-move") (May 25 – July 3, 1944)  — Seventh anti-Partisan Offensive; Action against the Yugoslav Partisan HQ
 Pfingsrose (June 2–13, 1944)  — anti-partisan operation in Belarus: Talka
 Pfingstausflug (June 1944)  — anti-partisan operation in Belarus: Sienno
 Windwirbel (June 1944)  — anti-partisan operation in Belarus: Chidra
 Sturmwind I and Sturmwind II ("Hurricane") (June 1944)  — largest anti-partisan action in Poland (see Battle of Osuchy)
 Feuerzange ("Fire-Tong") (1944)  — Action against Dalmatian Islands in the Adriatic

See also
List of partisan operations in World War II
Resistance during World War II
Seven Enemy Offensives

References

Citations

Bibliography

External links
German Antiguerrilla Operations in the Balkans (1941–1944)

 
Battles and operations of World War II
Counterinsurgency